Shawn Olmstead is an American volleyball head coach for the BYU Cougars men's volleyball team. He previously served as head coach for the women's volleyball team. In 2014, he was named the American Volleyball Coaches Association Coach of the Year. His sister, Heather Olmstead, coaches the BYU Cougars women's volleyball team.

Personal life
Olmstead is one of seven children born to parents Rick and Trudy Olmstead and is the only boy in the family. Olmstead is a member of the Church of Jesus Christ of Latter-day Saints and served a mission for the Church in Mendoza, Argentina from 1997 to 1999. Olmstead is married to former Cougar Farrah Hofheins, and they have three daughters and a son.

Career

High school
Olmstead attended Carpinteria High School for four years. Prior to his junior year he played club volleyball in Santa Barbara because Carpinteria didn't have a boys volleyball team. During his junior year he helped start the boys volleyball team. He went on to be a two-year starter and was awarded an MVP award. He also set a school record for kills in a single match.

BYU College Years
After graduating from Carpinteria High School, Olmstead was brought to BYU where he played on the BYU Cougars men's volleyball team from 2000 until 2004 while majoring in Spanish Education with a minor in Sociology. During three of his four seasons BYU made the national championship, 
winning it twice in 2001 and 2004. During his senior season Olmstead started at libero, recorded the third-most digs in a single season (230) in school history, and earned Mountain Pacific Sports Federation All-Tournament honors.

He graduated from BYU in 2004 and joined the coaching staff at Cal Poly San Luis Obispo in 2005 where he also served as recruiting coordinator. During that lone season he helped turn the Mustangs from a 5–24 team to a 19–6 record. The following April Olmstead moved back to Utah where he joined the Utah State Aggies coaching staff for an additional two seasons.

BYU Coaching
In 2008, Olmstead returned to BYU to help revitalize the women's volleyball team. After 4 years Olmstead was offered the position of head coach when Shay Goulding resigned. He agreed upon the condition that Heather be allowed to come on as his assistant. The two worked together for four seasons until he moved over to the men's team.

During his time as head coach Olmstead has led BYU to the national championship 4 times (one women's, three men's) as well as coached numerous All-Americans. Shawn attributes the success to being willing to learn.

Head coaching record

|-

References

External links
 Staff profile

Living people
Year of birth missing (living people)
Latter Day Saints from California
People from Carpinteria, California
BYU Cougars women's volleyball coaches
BYU Cougars men's volleyball coaches
BYU Cougars men's volleyball players
American men's volleyball players
American volleyball coaches